Minnesota Fats, or George Hegerman, is a fictional pool hustler created by American novelist Walter Tevis. The character appears in Tevis' novel The Hustler (1959). Jackie Gleason portrayed the character in the 1961 film adaptation of The Hustler, a performance that received several awards and nominations.

The character was an original creation of Tevis, though a real pool hustler, Rudolf Wanderone, who began calling himself "Minnesota Fats" in 1961, claimed to be the inspiration. Tevis denied Wanderone's claim, though Wanderone capitalized on it for years.

Rudolf Wanderone as "Minnesota Fats"
Real-life pool hustler and entertainer Rudolf Wanderone was known as "New York Fats" (among other nicknames) when the book was published.  Realizing there was money to be made from being associated with the success of the book and subsequent film, he changed his nickname to match the fictional name and later went on to play himself as the character "Minnesota Fats" in the film The Player (1971). Tevis consistently denied that Wanderone had anything to do with the author's character, writing in a subsequent printing of The Hustler: "I made up Minnesota Fats—name and all—as surely as Disney made up Donald Duck." However, Derek Kirunchyk examined the pages of Tevis' original manuscript and discovered that Tevis had changed the character's nickname from "New York" to "Minnesota" in one of the original manuscript pages, lending credence to Wanderone's claim that he was the inspiration for the character.

Wanderone's association with the name started in 1961. That year, while at a drive-in movie theater owned by a friend of Wanderone's (George Jansco), in Johnston City, Illinois, showing The Hustler, Wanderone boasted that the author had based the character upon him, a story which was picked up by local news and subsequently by the national press outlets. Willie Mosconi – famed as the 19-time winner of the World Straight Pool Championship and technical adviser for The Hustler – disputed the claim, which had the paradoxical effect of giving it more notoriety. Wanderone capitalized on this, threatening to sue Tevis and 20th Century Fox. Tevis responded by denying he had ever met Wanderone. Meanwhile, the press covered it all, and the association became fixed. Wanderone's second wife later claimed that a financial settlement had been made by Tevis to avoid a lawsuit, which Wanderone's first wife denied.

Film
Jackie Gleason played Minnesota Fats in the 1961 adaptation of The Hustler. His performance earned Best Supporting Actor nominations for the Academy Award and the Golden Globe, and the Best Supporting Actor award by the National Board of Review of Motion Pictures. The Minnesota Fats character did not appear in the 1986 film version, The Color of Money, which had an entirely different storyline from the novel.

See also 

 Minnesota Fats: Pool Legend, a Sega Genesis and Sega Saturn video game

References

Fictional male sportspeople
Fictional gamblers
Drama film characters
Literary characters introduced in 1959
Fictional con artists
Characters in American novels of the 20th century